Albert Falls is a town in Umgungundlovu District Municipality in the KwaZulu-Natal province of South Africa. It is next to the Albert Falls Game Reserve and the Albert Falls Dam.

References

Populated places in the uMshwathi Local Municipality